Baia was an ancient city and bishopric in the Roman province of Africa Proconsulare. It is a Roman Catholic titular see.

History 
Baia, identified as modern Henchir-Settara or Henchir-El-Hammam in present-day Algeria, was among the many towns that were important enough in the Roman province of Numidia to become a suffragan diocese in the papal sway.

Five of its Catholic Bishops are historically recorded:
 Felix participated in a synod called by bishop Gratus of Carthage in 349
 Beianus, on the side of Maximianus of Carthage against the Donatist heresy in 394.
 Valentinus attended as Catholic bishop the Council of Carthage in 411, held by the command of the (Western) Roman Emperor Honorius, as did his Donatist counterpart Quintasius, on that very heresy.
 Valentinus participated as Primate of Numidia the synod of Carthage in 419, regarding the question of appeals to Rome.
 Asclepius, author writing against Arianism and Donatism, mid fifth century

Titular see 
The diocese was nominally restored (again?) in 1933 as Latin Titular bishopric of Baia (Latin = Curiate Italian) / Baianen(sis) (Latin adjective).

It has had the following incumbents, so far of the fitting Episcopal (lowest) rank :
 Miguel Alviter, Dominican Order (O.P.) (1502.04.04 – ?) as Auxiliary Bishop of Diocese of Plasencia (Spain) (1502.04.04 – ?)
 Anthony Victor Hälg, Benedictine Order (O.S.B.) (born Switzerland) (1949.01.13 – death 1975.11.29), first as Coadjutor Abbot of Territorial Abbacy of Ndanda (Tanzania) (1949.01.13 – succession 1949.12.15), then as Abbot Ordinary of Ndanda (1949.12.15 – retired 1972), finally on emeritate
 László Tóth (1976.04.02 – death 1997.07.06) as Auxiliary Bishop of Diocese of Veszprem (Hungary) (1976.04.02 – 1987.06.05) and on emeritate
 Adriano Langa, Friars Minor (O.F.M.) (1997.10.24 – 2005.04.01) as Auxiliary Bishop of Archdiocese of Maputo (Mozambique) (1997.10.24 – 2005.04.01); later Coadjutor Bishop of Inhambane (Mozambique) (2005.04.01 – 2006.09.07), succeeding as Bishop of Inhambane (2006.09.07 – ...)
 Denis James Madden (2005.05.10 – ...), first as Auxiliary Bishop of Archdiocese of Baltimore (Maryland, USA) (2005.05.10 – 2016.12.05), then on emeritate.

See also 
 List of Catholic dioceses in Algeria

References

Sources and external links 
 GCatholic 
 Bibliography
 Pius Bonifacius Gams, Series episcoporum Ecclesiae Catholicae, Leipzig 1931, p. 464
 Stefano Antonio Morcelli, Africa christiana, Volume I, Brescia 1816, p. 94
 Auguste Audollent, lemma 'Baiensis' in Dictionnaire d'Histoire et de Géographie ecclésiastiques, vol. VI, 1932, coll. 240-241
 Joseph Mesnage, L'Afrique chrétienne, Paris 1912, p. 369
 Mansi, Sacrorum conciliorum nova et amplissima collectio, volumes III & IV, passim
 
 
Catholic titular sees in Africa
Suppressed Roman Catholic dioceses